Bryan Alexander Tamacas López (born 21 February 1995) is a Salvadoran professional footballer who plays as a defender for USL Championship club Oakland Roots and the El Salvador national team.

International career

Youth
Tamacas has played for El Salvador at the under-17, under-20 and under-21 levels.

Senior
Tamacas made his international debut for El Salvador he started and played 86 minute in a friendly match against the Armenia on 1 June 2016. At the 2021 Gold Cup, he won the Fighting Spirit Award for an incredible assist he made in the game of El Salvador vs Qatar.

Honours
Santa Tecla
 Primera División: Clausura 2015, Apertura 2016, Clausura 2017

El Salvador
 Fighting Spirit Award: 2021 CONCACAF Gold Cup

Career statistics

International goals
Scores and results list El Salvador's goal tally first.

References

External links
 
 

1995 births
Living people
Salvadoran footballers
El Salvador international footballers
Association football defenders
2015 CONCACAF U-20 Championship players
2017 Copa Centroamericana players
2017 CONCACAF Gold Cup players
C.D. FAS footballers
Santa Tecla F.C. footballers
Sportivo Luqueño players
Alianza F.C. footballers
Oakland Roots SC players
Paraguayan Primera División players
Sportspeople from San Salvador
2019 CONCACAF Gold Cup players
2021 CONCACAF Gold Cup players